The New Monday is the third studio album by American electronic musician Shigeto. It was released on October 6, 2017 through Ghostly International.

Track listing

References

2017 albums
Ghostly International albums